Paul Harig (3 July 1900 – 24 May 1977) was a German politician of the Communist Party (KPD) and former member of the German Bundestag.

Life 
From 1949 to 1953 Harig was a member of the German Bundestag. He was elected to the Bundestag via the North Rhine-Westphalia state list.

Literature

References

1900 births
1977 deaths
Communist Party of Germany politicians
Members of the Bundestag for North Rhine-Westphalia
Members of the Bundestag 1949–1953
Members of the Bundestag for the Communist Party of Germany